The Superior Air Parts XP-382 is an aircraft engine, designed and produced by Superior Air Parts of Coppell, Texas, United States for use in homebuilt aircraft.

The company is owned by the Chinese company Superior Aviation Beijing, which is 60% owned by Chairman Cheng Shenzong and 40% owned by Beijing E-Town, an economic development agency of the municipal government of Beijing.

Design and development
The engine is a four-cylinder four-stroke, horizontally-opposed,  displacement, fuel injected air-cooled, direct-drive, gasoline engine design. It produces , with an 8.9:1 compression ratio.

The engine is not type certified and is therefore intended for homebuilt aircraft.

In March 2019 the engine type was withdrawn from service and all customer engines were subject to a mandatory, immediate buy-back by the manufacturer to remove them from service. The company made this decision based on detonation problems found in some XP-400 engines that could not be resolved. Due to parts commonality, the decision was made to buy-back the XP-382 engines as well.

Specifications (XP-382)

See also

References

External links

Superior Air Parts engines
Air-cooled aircraft piston engines
1990s aircraft piston engines